The Smith & Wesson M&P15-22 is a .22 LR variant of the Smith & Wesson M&P15 semi-automatic rifle, but is blowback-operated rather than direct impingement-operated.  It is intended for recreational shooting ("plinking") and small game hunting.  It is made with a polymer upper and lower receiver rather than the aluminum alloy that is normally used in AR-15 style rifles, and uses proprietary polymer box magazines.

Design
The M&P15-22 was designed to be a less expensive alternative for training with an AR-15 style rifle, as the rifle itself is much less expensive than most AR-15s, and the .22 LR ammunition is often much less expensive than the .223 Remington/5.56×45mm NATO.  The rifle features a safety and bolt lock that operate just like an AR-15's.  The M&P15-22 can also be an alternative in jurisdictions that restrict magazine capacity for centerfire cartridges.

The M&P15-22's lower recoil is used as a way to ease new shooters into the sport, allowing them to familiarize themselves with AR-15 controls without the fear of excessive recoil or noise. The disassembly process is very similar to the AR-15 and S&W M&P 15. The lower receiver detaches from the upper with two captured pins. The lower receiver contains a standard M&P15 trigger assembly that is compatible with most AR-15 trigger groups. The upper receiver contains the bolt, barrel, and charging handle. However, the upper and lower receivers of the M&P 15-22  are  both deliberately incompatible with standard AR15/M4 uppers and lowers.

Variants
The M&P15-22 Sport II can be had with MOE (Magpul Original Equipment) furnitures, MBUS sights and a threaded barrel.

Smith & Wesson offers the M&P 15/22 in a variety of finishes including Kryptek Highlander and Muddy Girl in addition to basic black or tan.

Safety issue
In 2016, Project Appleseed temporarily banned use of M&P15-22 rifles at their shooting clinics following a series of out-of-battery discharges, pending a full investigation and correction from Smith & Wesson. This was based on several incidents that occurred in multiple states, including one that injured a shooter on the line and another where multiple cartridges fired with but one trigger pull.

See also
Cadet rifle

References

Rifles of the United States
.22 LR semi-automatic rifles
Smith & Wesson firearms
ArmaLite AR-10 derivatives